The East Kent Militia, later the 3rd Battalion, Buffs (East Kent Regiment) was an auxiliary regiment raised in Kent in South East England. From its formal creation in 1760 the regiment served in home and colonial defence in all of Britain's major wars until 1918, seeing active service in the Second Boer War and supplying thousands of reinforcements to the Buffs during World War I.

Background

The universal obligation to military service in the Shire levy was long established in England and its legal basis was updated by two Acts of 1557, which placed selected men, the 'Trained Bands', under the command of Lords Lieutenant appointed by the monarch. This is seen as the starting date for the organised county militia in England. The Kent Trained Bands were on high alert during the Armada crisis in 1588 and saw some active service during the English Civil War. The Militia was re-established in 1662 after the Restoration of the Monarchy, and was popularly seen as the 'Constitutional Force' in contrast to the 'Standing Army' that was tainted by association with the New Model Army that had supported the military dictatorship of The Protectorate. The militia were kept up during the wars against Louis XIV, when Kent's contingent consisted of six regiments. However, the militia declined in the years after the Peace of Utrecht in 1713.

East Kent Militia
Under threat of French invasion during the Seven Years' War a series of Militia Acts from 1757 re-established county militia regiments, the men being conscripted by means of parish ballots (paid substitutes were permitted) to serve for three years. There was a property qualification for officers, who were commissioned by the lord lieutenant. Kent was given a quota of 960 men to raise, and quickly formed the West Kent Militia, which received its weapons on 20 November 1758 and was embodied for service the following year. The East Kent Militia followed, its weapons being dispatched from the Tower of London on 25 February 1760, when it had reached 60 per cent of its establishment strength. Its headquarters was at Canterbury. However, unlike the West Kents, it was not embodied for fulltime service during the war.

War of American Independence
The Militia was called out after the outbreak of the War of American Independence when the country was threatened with invasion by the Americans' allies, France and Spain. This time the East Kent Militia was embodied on 31 March 1778. That summer the regiment was at Warley Camp in Essex, training alongside other Militia and Regular regiments. John Sawbridge of Olantigh, Kent, Member of Parliament (MP) and former Lord Mayor of London, was commissioned as Colonel of the regiment in 1779 and held the command until his death in 1795. The militia was disembodied at the conclusion of the war in 1782. From 1784 to 1792 the regiments were supposed to assemble for 28 days' annual training, even though to save money only two-thirds of the men were actually called out each year.

French Revolutionary and Napoleonic Wars
The militia was already being embodied when Revolutionary France declared war on Britain on 1 February 1793. The French Revolutionary Wars saw a new phase for the English militia: they were embodied for a whole generation, and became regiments of full-time professional soldiers (though restricted to service in the British Isles), which the regular army increasingly saw as a prime source of recruits. They served in coast defences, manning garrisons, guarding prisoners of war, and for internal security, while their traditional local defence duties were taken over by the Volunteers and mounted Yeomanry. On the death of Col Sawbridge, Sir Narborough D'Aeth, 3rd Baronet,  of Knowlton, Kent, was appointed to succeed him on 3 March 1795.

The war ended with the Treaty of Amiens in March 1802 and all the militia were stood down. However, the Peace of Amiens was short-lived and the regiments, whose training commitment had been increased from 21 to 28 days a year, were embodied again in 1803. In the summer of 1805 the East Kents were stationed at Dover until relieved by the Hereford Militia on 1 July. Sir Narborough D'Aeth died in 1808 and Samuel Elias Sawbridge of Olantigh, former MP for Canterbury and son of the previous colonel, was appointed on 14 April 1808. He had been first commissioned into the regiment as an ensign in 1790, and retained the command until his own death in 1850.

Legislation was passed in 1811 permitting English militia regiments to serve in Ireland for two years, and the East Kent Militia served in Ireland from 13 September 1811 to 8 October 1813. It was disembodied in June 1814, and was not called out during the short Waterloo Campaign.

1852 Reforms
After Waterloo there was another long peace. Although officers continued to be commissioned into the militia and ballots were still held, the regiments were rarely assembled for training and the permanent staffs of sergeants and drummers were progressively reduced. The Militia of the United Kingdom was revived by the Militia Act of 1852, enacted during a renewed period of international tension. As before, units were raised and administered on a county basis, and filled by voluntary enlistment (although conscription by means of the Militia Ballot might be used if the counties failed to meet their quotas). Training was for 56 days on enlistment, then for 21–28 days per year, during which the men received full army pay. Under the Act, Militia units could be embodied by Royal Proclamation for full-time home defence service in three circumstances:
 1. 'Whenever a state of war exists between Her Majesty and any foreign power'.
 2. 'In all cases of invasion or upon imminent danger thereof'.
 3. 'In all cases of rebellion or insurrection'.

The position of colonel was abolished in militia regiments, the commanding officer in future holding the rank of lieutenant-colonel, although the regiment could appoint an honorary colonel.

Crimean War and after
War having broken out with Russia in 1854 and an expeditionary force sent to the Crimea, the militia began to be called out for home defence. The East Kent Militia was embodied in 1854 and was stationed at Chichester by 9 June, moving to Portsmouth by 8 September, and was then at Woolwich from November to Marc 1855. The regiment then volunteered for overseas garrison service and was sent to Malta, arriving by May and remaining for a year. The regiment was disembodied in 1856, and was awarded the Mediterranean Battle Honour.

The East Kents were among the small number of militia regiments embodied during the Indian Mutiny to relieve Regular troops. It was again stationed at Woolwich, by December 1857, then at Aldershot from July 1858 to July 1859. It moved to Portsmouth by 1 August, where it stayed until February 1860. Then by 5 March 1860 it had been sent to Weymouth, where it guarded convicts at Portland Prison working on the stone breakwaters of Portland Harbour., where there had been disturbances. It was relieved by the King's Own (1st Staffordshire) Militia in May before returning to Portsmouth where it was disembodied in June.

Thereafter the militia regiments were called out for their annual training.

Cardwell reforms
Under the 'Localisation of the Forces' scheme introduced by the Cardwell Reforms of 1872, militia regiments were brigaded with their local regular and Volunteer battalions – for the East Kent Militia this was with the two battalions of the Buffs (East Kent Regiment) in Sub-District No 45 (County of Kent) at Canterbury. The militia now came under the War Office rather than their county lords lieutenant. Around a third of the recruits and many young officers went on to join the regular army.

Although often referred to as brigades, the sub-districts were purely administrative organisations, but in a continuation of the Cardwell Reforms a mobilisation scheme began to appear in the Army List from December 1875. This assigned regular and militia units to places in an order of battle of corps, divisions and brigades for the 'Active Army', even though these formations were entirely theoretical, with no staff or services assigned. The East Kent Militia's assigned war station was in the Dover defences as part of the Garrison Army.

The Cardwell organisation envisaged two militia battalions to each sub-district, and the East Kent Militia formed a 2nd Battalion on 29 July 1876, though it was never fully formed.

3rd Battalion, Buffs (East Kent Regiment)

The Childers Reforms took Cardwell's reforms further, with the militia formally joining their linked regiments as their 3rd and 4th Battalions on 1 July 1881. Although the 2nd Bn East Kent Militia was designated to be the 4th Bn Buffs, it was only at cadre strength, and was absorbed by the 1st Bn (now 3rd Buffs) on 1 April 1888

The 3rd Bn Buffs was embodied from 9 March to 30 September 1885 during the Panjdeh Crisis.

Second Boer War
After the disasters of Black Week at the start of the Second Boer War in December 1899, most of the regular army was sent to South Africa, and many militia units were embodied to replace them for home defence and to garrison certain overseas stations. Some were then permitted to volunteer for active service in South Africa. The 3rd Buffs was embodied on 18 January 1900. After volunteering, 16 officers and 551 other ranks under the command of Lt-Col Theodore Brinckman sailed from Southampton to Cape Town on 10 March aboard the SS Moor. Arriving at Cape Town on 28 March the battalion was sent to Bethany in the Orange Free State (OFS), where it joined 22nd Brigade of 3rd Division on 2 April. Next day the brigade marched out to re-occupy Reddersburg, which it had done by 11 April. The battalion reached Dewetsdorp on 29 April.

On 9 June the battalion was rushed to reinforce the garrison at Kroonstad, and on 23 June five of its companies were included in a 2000-strong column sent  to relieve Maj-Gen Arthur Paget, besieged at Lindley. The column met considerable opposition, with two days' hard fighting at Doornkloof and Paardeplats, but succeeded in its object and entered the town on 27 June. Afterwards, Lt-Gen Thomas Kelly-Kenny, commanding the Lines of Communication, wrote to Lord Roberts, commanding in South Africa, that 'he was pleased to observe that a Militia Battn (the 3rd Buffs) distinguished itself on this occasion'. The battalion then returned to Kroonstad, escorting the convoy of wounded and sick.

On 25 September the 3rd Buffs left as escort to a construction train repairing the branch railway between Wolverhoek and Heilbron and on 3 October took part in engagements between the two towns as De Wet crossed the railway. On 10 October the battalion joined a column under Lt-Gen Sir Archibald Hunter on a sweep through north-west OFS, returning on 26 October. Two companies then accompanied Hunter to Ventersdorp, which he entered on 30 October. He wrote to Roberts that 'The 3rd Bn of The Buffs was hotly engaged and behaved with conspicuous steadiness'. Until 15 December the battalion was employed in guarding the railway, but Hunter requested it for Maj-Gen Hector MacDonald's march through the Springfontein area into Cape Colony to deal with a tBoer invasion. It took part in engagements at Bethulie Bridge, Olive Siding and Colesberg, returning to Kroonstad on 30 December. The weather had been extremely bad and the battalion was reduced by sickness to a strength of just three companies, which were used to garrison Kroonstad and Lindley.

For the next year the battalion was used for convoy escorts and to man the lines of blockhouses that were constructed to restrict the Boers' freedom of movement. On 1 August 1901 six men of the 3rd Buffs under Sergeant Pincott were manning Blockhouse 493/1 when they were attacked by 250–300 Boers. Sergeant Pincott was soon killed, but the garrison held out until only one was left unwounded and the Boers forced their way in. The Boers then withdrew having suffered heavy casualties. Skirmishes along the blockhouse lines were constant throughout the year. The 3rd Buffs were relieved and embarked on 21 January 1902, but only as far as Saint Helena. Here they spent a further six months guarding Boer prisoners of war. The battalion was finally disembodied on 17 July 1902.

Special Reserve
After the Boer War, the future of the Militia was called into question. There were moves to reform the Auxiliary Forces (Militia, Yeomanry and Volunteers) to take their place in the six Army Corps proposed by the Secretary of State for War, St John Brodrick. However, little of Brodrick's scheme was carried out. Under the more sweeping Haldane Reforms of 1908, the Militia was replaced by the Special Reserve (SR), a semi-professional force whose role was to provide reinforcement drafts for regular units serving overseas in wartime, rather like the earlier Militia Reserve. The battalion became the 3rd (Reserve) Battalion, Buffs (East Kent Regiment), on 28 June 1908.

First World War

The 3rd (SR) Battalion was embodied under the command of Lt-Col Harry Hirst (CO since 30 June 1912) on the outbreak of war on 4 August 1914 and four days later moved to its war station at Dover, where it remained in garrison for the whole war. From its base at the Citadel, its role was to equip the Reservists and Special Reservists of the Buffs and send them as reinforcement drafts to the Regular battalions serving overseas (the 1st on the Western Front, the 2nd, after its return from India, also served briefly on the Western Front and then from November 1915 spent the rest of the war at Salonika). Once the pool of reservists had dried up, the 3rd Bn trained thousands of raw recruits for the active service battalions. The 9th (Reserve) Battalion was formed alongside the 3rd Bn at Dover in October 1914 to provide reinforcements for the 'Kitchener's Army' battalions of the Buffs.

One draft for the 10th (Royal East Kent and West Kent Yeomanry) Bn, then serving in Palestine, was travelling aboard HM Transport Aragon when it was torpedoed and sunk off Alexandria on 30 December 1917. Although hundreds of men died in the sinking, the draft from the 3rd Buffs was praised for its discipline in parading on deck and then launching life rafts, with the loss of only one man missing from the draft.

3rd (Reserve) Battalion was disembodied on 12 September 1919, when the remaining personnel were drafted to the 1st Bn.

Postwar
The SR resumed its old title of Militia in 1921 but like most militia units the 3rd Buffs remained in abeyance after World War I. By the outbreak of World War II in 1939, no officers remained listed for the battalion. The Militia was formally disbanded in April 1953.

Heritage & ceremonial

Uniforms & Insignia
As early as 1778 the Kent Militia regiments are reported to have worn red coats with grey facings, but a 1780 source suggests this was light blue. In the 19th Century both Kent Militia regiments wore facings described as 'Kentish Grey'. The badge for both regiments was the White Horse of Kent with the motto Invicta. The Shako plate of 1840 carried the White Horse in silver, with a scroll above inscribed 'East Kent' and a scroll beneath inscribed Invicta, the whole on a gilt crowned eight-pointed star.

After 1881 the battalion adopted the insignia of the Buffs, including its traditional buff coloured facings and Dragon badge.

Precedence
During the War of American Independence the counties were given an order of precedence determined by ballot each year. For the Kent Militia the positions were:
 12th on 1 June 1778
 4th on12 May 1779
 36th on 6 May 1780
 27th on 28 April 1781
 23rd on 7 May 1782

The militia order of precedence balloted for in 1793 (Kent was 1st) remained in force throughout the French Revolutionary War: this covered all the regiments in the county. Another ballot for precedence took place at the start of the Napoleonic War, when Kent was 57th.This order continued until 1833. In that year the King drew the lots for individual regiments and the resulting list remained in force with minor amendments until the end of the militia. The regiments raised before the peace of 1763 took the first 47 places (West Kent was 37th); presumably because the East Kents were not embodied until 1778, it was placed in the second group as 49th. Formally, the regiment became the '49th, or East Kent Militia', but most regiments paid little notice to the additional number.

Colonels
The following served as Colonel or (after 1852) Honorary Colonel of the regiment:

Colonel
 John Sawbridge, appointed 1779, died 21 February 1795
 Sir Narborough D'Aeth, 3rd Baronet, appointed 3 March 1795, died 6 April 1808
 Samuel Elias Sawbridge, appointed 14 April 1808, died 27 May 1850 
 Vacant
 George Brockman, former Captain, 85th Foot, appointed 15 September 1852

Honorary Colonel
 George, 3rd Baron Harris, GCSI, appointed 13 May 1864 
 Lt-Gen George Bingham, CB, former CO, appointed 26 April 1873
 Maj-Gen Sir Leslie Rundle, KCB, CMG, DSO, appointed 21 June 1899
 Col Sir Theodore Brinckman, 3rd Baronet, CB, former CO, appointed 15 July 1907

Battle Honours
The regiment was awarded the following Battle Honours:
 Mediterranean
 South Africa 1900–02

Under Army Order 251 of 1910, the Special Reserve were to bear the same battle honours as their parent regiments, so the Mediterranean honour, which was peculiar to militia units, was extinguished.

See also
 Militia (Great Britain)
 Militia (United Kingdom)
 Special Reserve
 Kent Trained Bands
 Kent Militia
 West Kent Light Infantry
 Buffs (Royal East Kent Regiment)

Footnotes

Notes

References

 L.S. Amery (ed), The Times History of the War in South Africa 1899-1902, London: Sampson Low, Marston, 6 Vols 1900–09.
 W.Y. Baldry, 'Order of Precedence of Militia Regiments', Journal of the Society for Army Historical Research, Vol 15, No 57 (Spring 1936), pp. 5–16.
 Ian F.W. Beckett, The Amateur Military Tradition 1558–1945, Manchester: Manchester University Press, 1991, ISBN 0-7190-2912-0.
 W.Y. Carman, 'Militia Uniforms 1780',  Journal of the Society for Army Historical Research, Vol 36, No 147 (September 1958), pp. 108–9.
 W.Y. Carman, 'Philip J. de Loutherbourg and the Camp at Warley, 1778'. Journal of the Society for Army Historical Research, Vol 71, No 288 (Winter 1993), pp. 276–7.
 Col John K. Dunlop, The Development of the British Army 1899–1914, London: Methuen, 1938.
 Sir John Fortescue, A History of the British Army, Vol I, 2nd Edn, London: Macmillan, 1910.
 Sir John Fortescue, A History of the British Army, Vol II, London: Macmillan, 1899.
 Sir John Fortescue, A History of the British Army, Vol III, 2nd Edn, London: Macmillan, 1911.
 Sir John Fortescue,  A History of the British Army, Vol V, 1803–1807, London: Macmillan, 1910.
 J.B.M. Frederick, Lineage Book of British Land Forces 1660–1978, Vol I, Wakefield: Microform Academic, 1984, ISBN 1-85117-007-3.
 Lt-Col James Moncrieff Grierson (Col Peter S. Walton, ed.), Scarlet into Khaki: The British Army on the Eve of the Boer War, London: Sampson Low, 1899/London: Greenhill, 1988, ISBN 0-947898-81-6.
 Lt-Col H.G. Hart, The New Annual Army List, and Militia List (various dates from 1840).
 Col George Jackson Hay, An Epitomized History of the Militia (The Constitutional Force), London:United Service Gazette, 1905.
 Richard Holmes, Soldiers: Army Lives and Loyalties from Redcoats to Dusty Warriors, London: HarperPress, 2011, .
 Brig E.A. James, British Regiments 1914–18, London: Samson Books, 1978, ISBN 0-906304-03-2/Uckfield: Naval & Military Press, 2001, ISBN 978-1-84342-197-9.
 Roger Knight, Britain Against Napoleon: The Organization of Victory 1793–1815, London: Allen Lane, 2013/Penguin, 2014, ISBN 978-0-141-03894-0.
 N.B. Leslie, Battle Honours of the British and Indian Armies 1695–1914, London: Leo Cooper, 1970, ISBN 0-85052-004-5.
 Col R.S.H. Moody, Historical Records of The Buffs, East Kent Regiment, 1914–1919, London: Medici Society, 1922/Uckfield, Naval & Military Press, 2002, ISBN 978-1-84342395-9.
 H. Moyse-Bartlett, 'Dover at War', Journal of the Society for Army Historical Research, 1972, Vol 50, No 203 (Autumn 1972), pp. 131–54.
 Jim O'Brien, 'Militiamen in the Second Anglo-Boer War', Soldiers of the Queen, Issue 116, March 2004, pp. 19–21.
 H.G. Parkyn, 'English Militia Regiments 1757–1935: Their Badges and Buttons', Journal of the Society for Army Historical Research, Vol 15, No 60 (Winter 1936), pp. 216–248.
 Arthur Sleigh, The Royal Militia and Yeomanry Cavalry Army List, April 1850, London: British Army Despatch Press, 1850/Uckfield: Naval and Military Press, 1991, ISBN 978-1-84342-410-9.
 Edward M. Spiers, The Army and Society 1815–1914, London: Longmans, 1980, ISBN 0-582-48565-7.
 Edward M. Spiers, The Late Victorian Army 1868–1902, Manchester: Manchester University Press, 1992/Sandpiper Books, 1999, ISBN 0-7190-2659-8.
 War Office, A List of the Officers of the Militia, the Gentlemen & Yeomanry Cavalry, and Volunteer Infantry of the United Kingdom, 11th Edn, London: War Office, 14 October 1805/Uckfield: Naval and Military Press, 2005, ISBN 978-1-84574-207-2.
 J.R. Western, The English Militia in the Eighteenth Century, London: Routledge & Kegan Paul, 1965.
Capt C.H. Wylly, Col Charrington and Capt Bulwer, Historical Records of the 1st King’s Own Stafford Militia, now 3rd & 4th Battalions South Staffordshire Regiment, Lichfield: The Johnson's Head, 1902/London: Forgotten Books, 2015, ISBN 978-1-332-61671-9.

External sources
 Anglo-Boer War
 British Civil Wars, Commonwealth & Protectorate, 1638–1660 (the BCW Project)
 History of Parliament Online
 T.F. Mills, Land Forces of Britain, the Empire and Commonwealth – Regiments.org (archive site)
 Victorian Military Society, Soldiers of the Queen

Kent Militia
Infantry regiments of the British Army
Military units and formations in Kent
Military units and formations in Canterbury
Military units and formations established in 1760
Military units and formations disestablished in 1881
Kent